SOKO Linz is an Austrian police procedural television series that premiered on 1 February 2022. A collaboration between ORF and the German broadcaster ZDF, it is the eleventh offshoot of SOKO München, launched in 1978. "SOKO" is an abbreviation of the German word Sonderkommission, which means "special investigative team". The show, which replaces the first Austrian incarnation of the SOKO franchise, SOKO Kitzbühel, revolves around a police team that investigates murders and other serious crimes in the Austria-Germany-Czechia tripoint, centred on the city of Linz. The series has been approved for a second season, and filming began on 4 May 2022.

Cast and characters

See also
 List of Austrian television series

References

External links
 
 SOKO Linz on ORF
 SOKO Linz on ZDF

Linz
ORF (broadcaster) original programming
ZDF original programming
Austrian crime television series
2022 Austrian television series debuts
2020s Austrian television series
German-language television shows
Austrian television spin-offs